Sir William Brabazon, K.B. of Sproxton, Leicestershire was an English politician who represented Leicestershire and Northamptonshire in Parliament.

Ancestry

He was descended from Matthew Brabazon, the younger brother and heir of the Chief Justice of the King's Bench Roger Brabazon.

Career and life

William responded to King Edward I's call to arms to gather at Westminster and was knighted by Edward, the then Prince of Wales, in the Feast of the Swans at Westminster Abbey on 22 May 1306.

Sir William sat in the Parliament of September 1313 for Leicestershire.

He served in Guienne in 1325.

He sat in the Parliament of April 1343 for Northamptonshire.

Family
Sir William had the following issue:-

 John Brabazon. Sole daughter and heir Jane married Sir William Woodford, Serjeant-at-law, into which family the Brabazons' lands passed.

Sir William Brabazon was the ancestor of William Brabazon, Lord Justice of Ireland, and his Earl of Meath descendants.

Notes

References

English knights
People knighted at the Feast of the Swans
Knights of the Bath
Members of the Parliament of England for Leicestershire
English MPs 1313
English people of the Wars of Scottish Independence
People from the Borough of Melton
English MPs 1343
William